Sweden has participated in the Eurovision Song Contest 61 times since making its debut in 1958, missing only three contests since then (1964, 1970 and 1976). Since 1959, the Swedish entry has been chosen through an annual televised competition, known since 1967 as Melodifestivalen. At the  contest, Sweden was one of the first five countries to adopt televoting. Sweden has hosted the contest six times: three times in Stockholm, twice in Malmö and once in Gothenburg.

Sweden is one of the most successful competing countries in the Eurovision Song Contest, with a total of six victories, second only to 's seven wins. Sweden also has the most top five results of the 21st century, with 12; in total, Sweden has achieved 26 top five results in the contest.

Contest history

This remained the country's best result until , when Lill Lindfors and Svante Thuresson were second.

Thanks to their victory in Brighton, ABBA went on to gain worldwide success and become one of the best-selling pop groups of all time. In the 1980s, Sweden achieved three successive top three results. Together with Croatia and Malta, Sweden was one of only three countries to have never been relegated under the pre-2004 rules of the contest.

Melodifestivalen 

Melodifestivalen is an annual music competition organised by Swedish public broadcasters Sveriges Television (SVT) and Sveriges Radio (SR). It has chosen the country's representative for the Eurovision Song Contest since 1959. It is one of Sweden's most popular television shows, and it has been estimated that more than 4 million Swedes watch the show annually.

Almost every Swedish entry for Eurovision has been selected through Melodifestivalen. Only Sweden's first entry in 1958 was not selected through Melodifestivalen, having been selected internally by the Swedish broadcaster at the time, Sveriges Radio.

Participation overview

Congratulations: 50 Years of the Eurovision Song Contest

Hostings

Awards

Marcel Bezençon Awards

Winners by OGAE members

Related involvement

Conductors

Heads of delegation

Commentators and spokespersons

Over the years SVT commentary has been provided by several experienced radio and television presenters, including Jacob Dahlin, Ulf Elfving, Harald Treutiger, Pekka Heino, Kristian Luuk and Fredrik Belfrage. Since   (with the exceptions of 2013 and 2016), Edward af Sillén provided the SVT commentary alongside various dual commentators.

Other shows

Stage directors

Costume designers

Photogallery

See also 
 Melodifestivalen
 Sweden in the Junior Eurovision Song Contest – Junior version of the Eurovision Song Contest.
 Sweden in the Eurovision Dance Contest – Dance version of the Eurovision Song Contest.
 Sweden in the Eurovision Young Dancers – A competition organised by the EBU for younger dancers aged between 16 and 21.
 Sweden in the Eurovision Young Musicians – A competition organised by the EBU for musicians aged 18 years and younger.
 Sweden in the Turkvision Song Contest – A contest for countries and regions which are of Turkic-speaking or Turkic ethnicity.

Notes

References

External links 
 SVT's site for Melodifestivalen
 Swedish Radio's site for Melodifestivalen
 Gylleneskor.se
 ESC Sweden
 OGAE Sweden, the Swedish branch of the ESC fan club
 Schlager Party, a London series of schlager events
 Schlager Radio
 Points to and from Sweden eurovisioncovers.co.uk

 
Countries in the Eurovision Song Contest
Melodifestivalen